Irén Daruházi-Karcsics (18 March 1927 – 13 October 2011) was a Hungarian gymnast who competed in the 1948 Summer Olympics and in the 1952 Summer Olympics.

References

1927 births
2011 deaths
Hungarian female artistic gymnasts
Olympic gymnasts of Hungary
Gymnasts at the 1948 Summer Olympics
Gymnasts at the 1952 Summer Olympics
Olympic silver medalists for Hungary
Olympic bronze medalists for Hungary
Olympic medalists in gymnastics
Medalists at the 1952 Summer Olympics
Medalists at the 1948 Summer Olympics
20th-century Hungarian women
21st-century Hungarian women